The Olympic Village (German: "Olympisches Dorf") was constructed for the 1972 Summer Olympics in Munich, Germany and was used to house the athletes during the games. The Munich massacre took place in one of its apartment blocks, Connollystraße 31; the street was named for an Irish-American participant in the 1896 Olympics. The Olympic Village is in the north part of the Olympiapark.

Since 1973, the former male section is a neighborhood, and the female area is used as student housing area (German: "Studentenviertel auf dem Oberwiesenfeld" or "Studentendorf"). Some of the areas of this condominium needed to be completely rebuilt, right after a student revolt. On the night of 4 August 2007, party turned into a small riot, leading to heavy vandalism and the destruction of two houses by a set fire. In the night, 150 police officers were sent to control the situation.

Gallery

See also
 Olympiapark, Munich
 Nadisee

References

External links 

 http://www.olympiadorf.de/ (in German)
 Pictures of the village
 Association For The Residents' Interests Of The Olympic Village website

Venues of the 1972 Summer Olympics
Buildings and structures in Munich
Sports venues in Munich
Munich